Monson High School is a school located in Monson, Massachusetts, United States. The school's construction started in 2000 and was finished in 2002.  The Monson High School replaced the old Junior Senior High School which has now become Granite Valley Middle school. This is Monson's only high school and houses grades 7–12.

Athletics

The Monson High School mascot is the Mustang, the teams are known as the Monson Mustangs, and the school colors are blue and white.

See also
Palmer High School (Massachusetts)

References

Schools in Hampden County, Massachusetts
Public high schools in Massachusetts
Monson, Massachusetts